Yigal Azrouël is an Israeli American New York-based fashion designer.

Career
An avid surfer, born and raised in Israel of French-Moroccan descent, Yigal Azrouël draws his inspiration from his travels, art, architecture, nature, and above all, his hometown of New York City. He debuted his eponymous ready-to-wear collection in the fall of 1998, receiving instant acclaim, both commercially and critically.  In 2000, Yigal opened his atelier and showroom in New York's Garment District, where 80% of his collections are manufactured today, and began his participation at New York Fashion Week .

In February 2003, he opened his first freestanding boutique, designed by Dror Benshetrit, in Manhattan's Meatpacking District on West 14th Street. By 2004, Yigal Azrouël was inducted into the Council of Fashion Designers of America.  In October 2004, he showed his Spring Summer 2005 collection at the Ritz Carlton Paris for his first international showing. In 2009, Yigal was nominated for GQ Best New Menswear Designers in America. He collaborates with many artists, including Emery LeCrone's "Works & Process" commissions for the Guggenheim. Known for his expert draping and defined construction, the Yigal Azrouël signature appeal is minimal and fresh with a precise attention to detail. The Yigal Azrouël woman is effortlessly cool and confident, and this modern muse is the constant source of inspiration for his designs. Azrouël defines his aesthetic using high quality one-of-a-kind fabrics to drape structured, ultra feminine, modern silhouettes. Yigal prides himself in the craftsmanship; he finely sources original fabrics, furs, and embellishments from all over the world to create the finest products for his customer. All of which are sold domestically and internationally at select luxury retailers, online at yigal-azrouel.com, and at his Madison Avenue flagship boutique in New York City. Azrouël's designs have been worn by Cate Blanchett, Julia Roberts, Gwyneth Paltrow, Alicia Vikander, Emma Stone, Sandra Bullock, Madonna, Natalie Portman, Rooney Mara, Emma Watson, Anne Hathaway, Taylor Swift, Kendall Jenner, Suki Waterhouse, Kate Beckinsale, Allison Williams, Kristen Wiig, Kate Mara, Lily Collins, Chrissy Teigen, and Kate Bosworth.

References

External links 
 Official Site
 Style.com

Israeli fashion designers
Jewish fashion designers
Israeli emigrants to the United States
20th-century Moroccan Jews
Israeli people of Moroccan-Jewish descent
American people of Moroccan-Jewish descent
Year of birth missing (living people)
Living people